The NAACP Image Award for Outstanding Variety Series: arose as a category in 1994 after being part of the category Outstanding Variety Series/Special from 1988 to 1993. It ended in 1996 when it reverted to the original category Outstanding Variety Series/Special.

Winners and nominees

References

NAACP Image Awards